Cherry Grove is a populated place in the parish of Saint John, Barbados.
Cherry Grove is mainly a residential area. There is a grocery store, a bar & deli, and the Cherry Grove Gospel Hall.

See also
 List of cities, towns and villages in Barbados

References

Saint John, Barbados
Populated places in Barbados